Benjamin Pitman (July 24, 1822 – December 28, 1910), also known as Benn Pitman, was an English-born author and popularizer in the United States of Pitman shorthand, a form of what was then called phonography (shorthand). He was also active in the arts and crafts movement in the United States.

Early life
He was born at Trowbridge, Wiltshire, England.  He received a good elementary education there at home, and at a parish school supervised by George Crabbe, a poet. In 1837, he assisted his brother, Isaac Pitman, in perfecting the latter's system of shorthand. From 1843 until 1852, he lectured on the system throughout Great Britain, and had a large role in the compilation of his brother's textbooks. Around 1849, he married Jane Bragg of Manchester.

Shorthand & reporting
At Isaac's request, Benn, Jane and their two children went to the United States in January 1853 so Benn could instruct people in the United States on his brother's system. After brief stays in Philadelphia, Pennsylvania, and Canton, Ohio, they settled at Cincinnati, Ohio, where Benn founded the Phonographic Institute, of which he was long the president. He at first published his brother's shorthand textbooks, giving him credit for the system; but in 1857, when Isaac and his co-laborers made certain changes in the system, he refused to adopt them. Benn felt the original system was better, and the original system became the one which was adopted in the United States. In 1855, Pitman invented the electrochemical process of relief engraving.

From his arrival in the United States until 1873 Pitman was chiefly engaged in reporting. During the first years of the Civil War, he served in the Union Army. From 1863 to 1867, he acted as the official stenographer during the trials of the assassin of President Abraham Lincoln, the “Sons of Liberty,” the “Ku-Klux Klan,” and other similar government prosecutions. He also edited and compiled the printed reports of these trials.

Wood engraving
In 1873 he abandoned reporting and began teaching woodcarving courses at the McMicken School of Drawing and Design School of Design, later the Art Academy of Cincinnati, of the University of Cincinnati. His goal was to secure the development of American decorative art and to open up a new profession for women. The display of wood carving and painting on china sent to the Philadelphia Centennial Exhibition was the first attempt to give the public an idea of what had been accomplished. Over 100 pieces were exhibited, including elaborately decorated cabinets, baseboards, bedsteads, doors, casings, mantels, picture frames, and bookcases all the work of girls and women. He lectured at the Cincinnati Art School from 1873 until 1892 on art and wood engraving.

He introduced what later became known as the "Pitman School of Wood Carving", which provided for the treatment of naturalistic designs, and could produce very beautiful effects in wood sculpture. His influence as an artist came to be considerable, particularly throughout the midwest of the United States.

Personal life and death
Pitman's first wife, Jane, died in 1878.  They had three children.  He married Adelaide Nourse in 1881, and they had one child.  Benn Pitman died in 1910. His Cincinnati home, the Ben Pitman House, overlooks the Ohio River and is listed on the National Register of Historic Places.

Writings
 The Reporter's Companion (Cincinnati, 1854)
 The Manual of Phonography, of which 250,000 copies have been issued (1855)
 History of Shorthand (1858)
 Trials for Treason at Indianapolis
 The Assassination of President Lincoln, and the Trial of the Conspirators (1865)
 A Plea for American Decorative Art (1895)
 The Phonographic Dictionary, with Jerome B. Howard (1883 and 1899)
He also wrote many elementary books of instruction on phonography.
In 1902 he wrote a biography of his brother, Sir Isaac Pitman: His Life and Labors.

References

External links

1910 deaths
1822 births
American biographers
English emigrants to the United States
Artists from Cincinnati
People of Ohio in the American Civil War
Journalists from Ohio
Writers from Cincinnati